Ernst Aigner (born 31 October 1966 in Mödling) is a retired Austrian footballer.

Club career
A tall central defender, Aigner made his debut in the Austrian Bundesliga for Admira/Wacker in 1986 and finished runner-up to Swarovski Tirol with Admira in the 1988–89 season. Admira would also reach the Austrian Cup Final that season. His best season with Admira earned him a move to Austrian giants Austria Wien with whom he won 3 championships and 3 cups. In 1994, he signed for second division side VSE St. Pölten before returning to Admira in 1996. In 2001, he moved to ASK Kottingbrunn before retiring with amateur side 1. SC Sollenau.

International career
He played for the Austria national football team, making his debut in a victorious international friendly against Norway on 31 May 1989, 4-1. He was a participant at the 1990 World Cup. After the 1990 World Cup, Aigner played only one more international, which was against Yugoslavia on 31 October 1990.

Honours
Admira/Wacker
Austrian Cup
Runner-up (1): 1989

Austria Wien
Austrian Football Bundesliga
Runner-up (3): 1989-90, 1990-91, 1991-92, 1993-94
Austrian Cup
Winner (3): 1990, 1992, 1994

References

External links
Profile at Austria-Archiv.at 

1966 births
Living people
People from Mödling
Austrian footballers
Austria international footballers
1990 FIFA World Cup players
FC Admira Wacker Mödling players
FK Austria Wien players
Austrian Football Bundesliga players
Association football defenders
Footballers from Lower Austria